The Minister of Information and Culture is the head of the Ministry of Information and Culture along with serving as a member of the Federal Executive Council. As the head of the ministry, the minister leads the department and acts as a key spokesperson for the executive branch of the Nigerian federal government. The minister also leads a number of agencies and parastatals involved with affairs related to the press along with promoting culture and tourism.

The position is appointed by the president, with the advice and consent of the Senate of Nigeria. As stipulated by the Revenue Mobilisation Allocation and Fiscal Commission formula for ministerial salaries, the annual basic salary of the minister is ₦2,026,400 with ₦5,775,240 received in regular allowances for a total of ₦7,801,640 as the annual regular salary. Along with the regular salary, other allowances can raise the total payment to over ₦25 million.

The position is currently held by Lai Mohammed, who was originally sworn in as minister on 11 November 2015 following his confirmation by the Senate; Mohammed was re-appointed and confirmed for a second time in 2019, returning to the post on 21 August 2019.

See also

References 

Politics of Nigeria
Government of Nigeria